Furness Abbey is a former railway station in the Barrow-in-Furness area of the Furness Peninsula, England.

Context
Furness Abbey Station was situated to the north of Furness Abbey. As well as being the gateway for visitors to the romantic ruins of the Abbey and to the south lakes, the station - one of the company's finest - was closely linked to the Furness Abbey Hotel , owned by the Furness Railway Company. It also served Abbotswood, the home of Sir James Ramsden, Managing Director of the railway company, and other large houses at the semi-rural north end of Barrow-in-Furness.

History
The Furness Railway was authorised in 1844 to build a line which would link Kirkby-in-Furness with Dalton-in-Furness. The railway was extended in places and subsequently took over the Whitehaven and Furness Junction Railway and the Ulverston and Lancaster Railway. The original station at Furness Abbey was opened in 1846 and was substantially enlarged by 1862 to receive passengers from further afield - when the  London and North Western Railway was directly linked. After 1850 passengers had already begun to travel from West Cumbria, although the Furness company did not formally lease the coast line from Whitehaven until 1865.

Services
All services north of Barrow initially had to travel to Furness Abbey and then reverse back towards Dalton before continuing on to Askam. This practice eventually ceased in 1882, when the loop line to the new central Barrow station on Abbey Road was completed and trains could continue from there northwards to Askam without reversing.

Having been damaged by bombing in May 1941 (when the Furness Abbey Hotel was also hit), the station was closed by British Railways shortly after nationalisation, and was subsequently demolished in the early 1950s, as was the hotel.  Apart from some old track-bed and demolition debris associated with Sir James Ramsden's private siding, the only surviving part of the station is the former ticket office/refreshment room, which is now the Abbey Tavern.<ref> See YouTube/the Yellow Factory 'The Story of the Furness Abbey Hotel and Station'.

References

Bibliography

External links
Site of Former Furness Abbey Station

Buildings and structures in Barrow-in-Furness
Former buildings and structures in Barrow-in-Furness
Disused railway stations in Cumbria
Former Furness Railway stations
Railway stations in Great Britain opened in 1846
Railway stations in Great Britain closed in 1950
1846 establishments in England